Christian de Graaff (born late 1950s) was the Minister of Agriculture of Botswana from 2011 to 2015 and currently is a Member of Parliament for the Ghanzi District.

He is an ethnic Afrikaner from Ghanzi, which has historically had a large Boer population.

References

Agriculture ministers
Afrikaner people
Botswana people of Dutch descent
Botswana farmers
Government ministers of Botswana
Members of the National Assembly (Botswana)
People from Ghanzi District
White Botswana people
1950s births
Living people